Oliver Wendell Harrington (February 14, 1912 – November 2, 1995) was an American cartoonist and an outspoken advocate against racism and for civil rights in the United States. Of multi-ethnic descent, Langston Hughes called him "America's greatest African-American cartoonist". Harrington requested political asylum in East Germany in 1961; he lived in Berlin for the last three decades of his life.

Biography

Early life 
Born to Herbert and Euzsenie Turat Harrington in Valhalla, New York, Harrington was the oldest of five children. He began cartooning to vent his frustrations about a viciously racist sixth-grade teacher and graduated from DeWitt Clinton High School in the Bronx in 1929.

Cartooning career 
Immersing himself in the Harlem Renaissance, Harrington found employment when Ted Poston, city editor for the Amsterdam News became aware of Harrington's already considerable skills as a cartoonist and political satirist. In 1935, Harrington created Dark Laughter, a regular single panel cartoon, for that publication. The strip was later retitled Bootsie, after its most famous character, an ordinary African American dealing with racism in the U.S. Harrington described him as "a jolly, rather well-fed but soulful character." During this period, Harrington enrolled in Fine Arts at Yale University to complete his degree, but could not finish because of the United States entry into World War II.

On October 18, 1941, he started publication of Jive Gray (1941–1951), a weekly adventure comic strip about an eponymous African-American aviator; the strip went on until Harrington moved to Paris.

Civil rights 
During World War II, the Pittsburgh Courier sent Harrington as a correspondent to Europe and North Africa. In Italy, he met Walter White, executive secretary of the NAACP. After the war, White hired Harrington to develop the organization's public relations department, where he became a visible and outspoken advocate for civil rights.

In that capacity, Harrington published "Terror in Tennessee," a controversial expose of increased lynching violence in the post-WWII South. Given the publicity garnered by his sensational critique, Harrington was invited to debate with U.S. Attorney General Tom C. Clark on the topic of "The Struggle for Justice as a World Force." He confronted Clark for the U.S. government's failure to curb lynching and other racially motivated violence.

France 
In 1947, Harrington left the NAACP and returned to cartooning. In the postwar period his prominence and social activism brought him scrutiny from the Federal Bureau of Investigation and the House Un-American Activities Committee. Hoping to avoid further government scrutiny, Harrington moved to Paris in 1951. In Paris, Harrington joined a thriving community of African-American expatriate writers and artists, including James Baldwin, Chester Himes, and Richard Wright, who became a close friend.

Germany 
Harrington was shaken by Richard Wright's death in 1960, suspecting that he was assassinated. He thought that the American embassy had a deliberate campaign of harassment directed toward the expatriates. In 1961, he requested political asylum in East Germany. He spent the rest of his life in East Berlin, finding plentiful work and a cult following. He illustrated and contributed to publications such as Eulenspiegel, Das Magazin, and the Daily Worker.

Personal life 
Harrington had four children.  Two daughters are U.S. nationals; a third is a British national. All were born before Harrington emigrated to East Berlin.  His youngest child, a son, was born several years after Harrington married Helma Richter, a German journalist.

Publications
 Dark Laughter: The Satiric Art of Oliver W. Harrington, ed. M. Thomas Inge (Jackson: University Press of Mississippi, 1993).
 Why I Left America and Other Essays, ed. M. Thomas Inge (Jackson: University Press of Mississippi, 1993).
 Laughing on the Outside: The Intelligent White Reader's Guide to Negro Tales and Humor (New York: Grosset & Dunlap, 1965). [With  Philip Sterling and J. Saunders Redding].
 Bootsie and Others: A Selection of Cartoons (New York: Dodd, Mead, 1958).
 Hezekiah Horton (Viking Press, 1955). [with Ellen Tarry]
 Terror in Tennessee: The Truth about the Columbia Outrages (New York: "Committee of 100", 1946).

Exhibitions 
 2021–2022 "Dark Laughter Revisited: The Life and Times of Ollie Harrington" (Billy Ireland Cartoon Library & Museum, Ohio State University, Columbus, Ohio)

References

Further reading
 
 "Oliver W. Harrington." Contemporary Black Biography, Volume 9. Gale Research, 1995.
 "Oliver W. Harrington." Notable Black American Men. Gale Research, 1998.

External links

 PBS The Black Press biography
 The African-American Registry
Spartacus biography
Oliver Harrington Biography, The Civil Rights Struggle, African American GIs, and Germany
Bibliography at The Comics Reporter
FBI file on Ollie Harrington

1912 births
1995 deaths
Activists for African-American civil rights
African-American artists
African-American comics creators
American comics creators
American defectors
American editorial cartoonists
American expatriates in France
People from Valhalla, New York
American expatriates in East Germany
American emigrants to East Germany
DeWitt Clinton High School alumni
20th-century African-American people